Elías "Larry" Ayuso (born March 27, 1977) is a Puerto Rican former professional basketball player, who currently serves as head coach for the Piratas de Quebradillas of the Baloncesto Superior Nacional (BSN). Internationally, Ayuso has represented and played for the Puerto Rican national team since 2001. He was part of the 2004 team that defeated the United States at the 2004 Olympic Games.

Professional career
Ayuso has spent most of his career playing in Puerto Rico. He also has played in Europe with Montegranaro in Italy, Ionikos Neas Filadelfeias BC in Greece, Beşiktaş in Turkey, Spartak St. Petersburg in Russia, the Žalgiris Kaunas in Lithuania, and the KK Split and KK Cibona Zagreb in Croatia. 

Ayuso participated in the 2003 pre-season training camp of the San Antonio Spurs and the 2006 pre-season training camp with the Denver Nuggets of the NBA.

Ayuso led the BSN in 2002 scoring 703 points and achieving a 24.2 PPG average.

During the summer of 2004, Ayuso was a member of the Puerto Rico National Team that participated in the 2004 Olympics which defeated the United States.

In 2005, Ayuso helped the Captains win their first title since 1959 when Arecibo beat the Bayamón Cowboys in four games during the BSN finals.

During the summer of 2006, Ayuso was a member of the Puerto Rico National Team that participated in the 2006 FIBA World Championship. Ayuso scored 106 points with a 21.2 PPG and shot a .629 3-point percentage during the tournament.  Ayuso finished tied for fourth in PPG in the 2006 Worlds.  Due to his outstanding performance during the 2006 Worlds the Denver Nuggets invited him to the 2006 Training Camp and was added to the Pre-Season roster.

In February 2007, Ayuso signed with the KK Split of the Croatian A1 League.

During the summer of 2007, he joined the BSN Santurce Crabbers before joining the Puerto Rico National Team.  During his tenure with the Santurce Crabbers he led the team to win the BSN Championship over the Arecibo Captains. He was elected the 2007 BSN Finals MVP.

On 7 November 2008, Ayuso was drafted with the 2nd pick in the 2nd round (18th overall pick) by the Iowa Energy of the NBA Development League.

On July 3, 2010, Ayuso led the Arecibo Captains to the 2010 BSN Championship, beating the Vaqueros de Bayamón in seven games.

Coaching 
Ayuso was slated to coach Santurce for the 2022 season in the BSN, but opted to ask for his release to pursue other options. He signed with Quebradillas in March.

Personal life
Ayuso is a graduate of the University of Southern California with a bachelor's degree in Social Sciences. He is married with Puerto Rican model and host Angelique Burgos better known as "La Burbu" with whom he has two sons named Sahil Elías Ayuso and Kokoh Mar Ayuso.

Career statistics

NBA D-League

|-
| style="text-align:left;"| 
| style="text-align:left;"| Iowa
| 14 || 14 || 35.0 || .383 || .321 || .895 || 2.8 || 1.9 || 0.6 || 0.1 || 13.2
|- class="sortbottom"
| style="text-align:left;"| Career
| style="text-align:left;"|
| 14 || 14 || 35.0 || .383 || .321 || .895 || 2.8 || 1.9 || 0.6 || 0.1 || 13.2

BSN

|-
| align="left" | 1996
| align="left" | Quebradillas
| 27 || .363 || .322 || .869 || 1.4 || 0.6 || 8.6
|-
| align="left" | 1997
| align="left" | Quebradillas
| 17 || .344 || .327 || .794 || 1.9 || 0.4 || 6.4
|-
| align="left" | 1999
| align="left" | Quebradillas
| 28 || .444 || .352 || .818 || 1.7 || 1.0 || 10.3
|-
| align="left" | 2000
| align="left" | San Germán
| 28 || .461 || .402 || .826 || 3.0 || 1.7 || 16.3
|-
| align="left" | 2001
| align="left" | San Germán
| 26 || .495 || .455 || .881 || 4.4 || 1.8 || 22.3
|-
| align="left" | 2002
| align="left" | San Germán
| 29 || .451 || .426 || .864 || 3.4 || 1.9 || 24.2
|-
| align="left" | 2003
| align="left" | San Germán
| 4 || .362 || .270 || .947 || 4.5 || 3.8 || 19.5
|-
| align="left" | 2005
| align="left" | Arecibo
| 31 || .423 || .392 || .880 || 3.5 || 2.7 || 23.9
|-
| align="left" | 2006
| align="left" | Arecibo
| 26 || .400 || .379 || .807 || 3.1 || 2.6 || 19.9
|-
| align="left" | 2007
| align="left" | Santurce
| 7 || .458 || .455 || .908 || 2.4 || 3.0 || 24.6
|-
| align="left" | 2008
| align="left" | Santurce
| 30 || .442 || .393 || .859 || 1.9 || 1.9 || 19.7
|-
| align="left" | 2009
| align="left" | Santurce
| 30 || .470 || .420 || .880 || 2.9 || 1.5 || 21.9
|-
| align="left" | 2010
| align="left" | Arecibo
| 29 || .406 || .351 || .902 || 2.9 || 2.0 || 18.2
|-
| align="left" | 2011
| align="left" | Arecibo
| 22 || .384 || .382 || .896 || 2.3 || 0.9 || 19.0
|-
| align="left" | 2012
| align="left" | Arecibo
| 27 || .390 || .352 || .939 || 2.7 || 1.3 || 18.0
|-
| align="left" | 2013
| align="left" | Guaynabo
| 36 || .376 || .348 || .913 || 2.8 || 2.2 || 19.9
|-
| align="left" | 2014
| align="left" | Bayamon
| 36 || .362 || .334 || .905 || 2.5 || 1.8 || 16.9
|-
| align="left" | 2015
| align="left" | Guaynabo
| 44 || .416 || .365 || .872 || 2.2 || 2.0 || 18.8
|-
| align="left" | Career
| align="left" |N/A
| 477 || .418 || .380 || .876 || 2.7 || 1.7 || 18.2

EuroLeague

|-
| style="text-align:left;"| 2005–06
| style="text-align:left;"| Žalgiris
| 8 || 8 || 24.2 || .355 || .372 || .632 || 1.8 || 1.1 || 1.1 || .0 || 10.3 || 7.0
|-
| style="text-align:left;"| 2007–08
| style="text-align:left;"| Cibona Zagreb
| 13 || 12 || 29.2 || .476 || .296 || .921 || 2.5 || 1.5 || 1.0 || .0 || 12.8 || 8.7

See also
List of Puerto Ricans – Sports

References

External links
EuroLeague.net Profile
FIBA Profile
Basketball-Reference.com G-League Stats
Turkish League Profile
Puerto Rican League Profile 
Eurobasket.com Profile
Sports-Reference.com NCAA College Stats

1977 births
Living people
2002 FIBA World Championship players
2006 FIBA World Championship players
Atléticos de San Germán players
Baloncesto Superior Nacional players
Basketball players at the 2003 Pan American Games
Basketball players at the 2004 Summer Olympics
Basketball players at the 2015 Pan American Games
BC Žalgiris players
Beşiktaş men's basketball players
Cangrejeros de Santurce basketball players
Capitanes de Arecibo players
Central American and Caribbean Games bronze medalists for Puerto Rico
Central American and Caribbean Games medalists in basketball
Competitors at the 2014 Central American and Caribbean Games
Grand Rapids Hoops players
Huracanes del Atlántico players
Ionikos N.F. B.C. players
Iowa Energy players
KK Cibona players
KK Split players
Medalists at the 2003 Pan American Games
Olympic basketball players of Puerto Rico
Pan American Games bronze medalists for Puerto Rico
Pan American Games medalists in basketball
People from Aguas Buenas, Puerto Rico
Piratas de Quebradillas players
Puerto Rican men's basketball players
Puerto Rico men's national basketball team players
Shooting guards
USC Trojans men's basketball players